Gehurmordeh-ye Silab (also Romanized as Gehūrmordeh-ye Sīlāb; also known as Gowhar Mordeh) is a village in Zilayi Rural District, Margown District, Boyer-Ahmad County, Kohgiluyeh and Boyer-Ahmad Province, Iran. At the 2006 census, its population was 163, in 27 families.

References 

Populated places in Boyer-Ahmad County